JOC may refer to:
 Japanese Olympic Committee, the national Olympic committee in Japan for the Olympic Games movement
 Young Christian Workers (Jeunesse ouvrière chrétienne in French), an international Catholic organization of the Young Trade Unionists
 Several Military Organisations called Joint Operations Command:
 Canadian Joint Operations Command
 Joint Operations Command (Australia)
 Joint Operations Command (Sri Lanka)
 Joint Operations Command (UK)
 Joint Operations Command (Zimbabwe)
 The Journal of Organic Chemistry, a peer-reviewed scientific journal
 JOC Group Inc., a provider of information on international trade, trade, and logistics professionals.
 Chief Journalist, a former U.S. Navy occupational rating

Joc may refer to:

Joc dance ensemble, Moldovan republic
 Joc Pederson (born 1992),  American professional baseball outfielder 
 Yung Joc (born 1983), American rapper